is a Japanese footballer currently playing as a midfielder for V-Varen Nagasaki.

Career statistics

Club
.

Notes

References

External links

1998 births
Living people
Waseda University alumni
Japanese footballers
Association football midfielders
J2 League players
V-Varen Nagasaki players